The 2019 season was Mjøndalen IF's first season back in the Eliteserien since 2015.

Squad

Out on loan

Transfers

In

Loans in

Out

Loans out

Released

Competitions

Eliteserien

Results summary

Results by round

Results

Table

Norwegian Cup

Squad statistics

Appearances and goals

|-
|colspan="14"|Players away from Mjøndalen on loan:

|-
|colspan="14"|Players who left Mjøndalen during the season

|}

Goal scorers

Clean sheets

Disciplinary record

References

Mjøndalen IF
Mjøndalen IF Fotball seasons